Montigny–Beauchamp is a station between Montigny-lès-Cormeilles and Beauchamp, in the northwestern suburbs of Paris. It is served by Transilien regional trains from Paris to Pontoise, and by RER rapid transit.

See also 
 List of stations of the Paris RER

External links

 

Réseau Express Régional stations
Railway stations in Val-d'Oise
Railway stations in France opened in 1846